The MasterWorks Festival is a month-long intensive summer training program for classical performing artists. Beginning in 2018, MasterWorks will be held in Spartanburg, SC, USA, at Converse College. It was co-founded in 1997 by the former artistic director of the Christian Performing Artists' Fellowship (CPAF), Dr. Patrick Kavanaugh and his wife Barbara, and by the trombonist James Kraft and his wife Mary Jeane.

MasterWorks Festival is operated on the campus of Converse College. It focuses on intense artistic training and deep spiritual growth. MasterWorks offers master classes for classical musicians, dancers and actors instructed by world-renowned performing artists. It has featured performers such as Midori Goto, Christopher Parkening, Rebecca Wright, Rachel Barton Pine, Jeanette Clift George, John Dalley, Lawrence Dutton, Ann Schein, David Kim, Alan Chow, Anne Martindale Williams, David Hardy, Doug Yeo, Christine Smith, Steve Hendrickson, John Nelson, Phil Smith, Paula Robison, Stephen Clapp and the Ying String Quartet.

The MasterWorks Festival runs several programs, the largest of which is the Orchestra Program for students ages 14 to 26. There are also unique Intensive Study Programs for Strings, Piano, Winds and Voice. In addition, there is a Theatre program, a Film program, as well as a 3-day Choral program. Previously, the MasterWorks Festival had an Opera program and a Ballet program. MasterWorks also hosts a summer intensive technical internship program, which assists in productions throughout the festival.

In 2004, MasterWorks expanded outside the US and MasterWorks Europe took place in London, England. Since then, other non-USA MasterWorks Festivals have taken place in Winchester, England, and in China.

Further reading
Masterworks Festival website
Kavanaugh, Patrick, The Story of the Christian Performing Artists' Fellowship, Winona Lake, Indiana, Christian Performing Artists' Fellowship.
The Christian Performing Artists' Fellowship. (2006) MasterWorks Festival Brochure. Winona Lake, Indiana. Christian Performing Artists' Fellowship.
Cook, Jane, G., and Heckman, Paul, (2001), Winona Lake Summers, North Manchester, Indiana. ICanPublish.

Classical music festivals in the United States
Theatre festivals in the United States
Christian performing arts